Sirenik or Sireniki are former speakers of a divergent Eskimo language in Siberia, before its extinction. The total language death of this language means that now the cultural identity of Sirenik Eskimos is maintained through other aspects: slight dialectical difference in the adopted Siberian Yupik language; sense of place, including appreciation of the antiquity of their settlement Sirenik.

Location 

At the beginning of the 20th century, speakers of the Sirenik Eskimo language inhabited the settlements of Sirenik, Imtuk, and some small villages stretching to the west from Sirenik along south-eastern coasts of the Chukchi Peninsula. As early as in 1895, Imtuk was already a settlement with mixed population of Sirenik Eskimos and Ungazigmit (the latter belonging to Siberian Yupik).

Language 

The Eskimo population of settlement of Сиреники (Sireniki, plural of Sirenik) formerly spoke an Eskimo language with several unique traits. For example, dual number is not known in Sirenik Eskimo, while most Eskimo–Aleut languages have dual, including the neighboring Siberian Yupik relatives. These differences amounted to mutual unintelligibility with Siberian Yupik and Sirenik Eskimo's nearest language relatives. The language is now extinct.

Language differences (even from its neighboring Eskimo relatives) meant Sirenik Eskimos had to speak either Siberian Yupik or Chukchi, an unrelated language, to communicate with the neighboring (linguistically related) Siberian Yupik. These were distinct, mutually unintelligible languages.

The linguistic classification of Sirenik Eskimo language is still under debate. It is sometimes regarded as a third branch of Eskimo (along with Inuit and Yupik), but is also sometimes classified as a Yupik language.

The last native speaker of Sirenink Eskimo, Vyie (Valentina Wye) died in January 1997. Thus, the language is extinct, and today Sirenik Eskimos speak Siberian Yupik language and/or Russian.

History 

Little is known about Sirineki history, besides some conjectures based on linguistical consideration. Sirenik Eskimo culture has been influenced by that of Chukchi (witnessed also by folktale motifs).

Location 

Sireniki is an old settlement; it has existed at least for 2500 years. It is the only Eskimo village in Siberia that has not been relocated, even during the assimilation policy. This fact is a part of establishing recent cultural identity of Sireniki Eskimos.

Diachronic linguistics 

Little is known about the history of the Sirenik Eskimo language. The uniqueness of the Sirenik language may be the result of a supposed long isolation from other Eskimo groups,  and contact with speakers of unrelated languages for many centuries. Influence by Chukchi language is clear.

There are evidences that this small language had at least two territorial dialects in the past, although the number of its speakers was very few even at the end of the nineteenth century.

Cultural identity 

The total language death of Sirenik Eskimo language means that now the cultural identity of Sirenik Eskimos is maintained through other aspects:
 Some of these factors are still of linguistic nature. Although during the language shift the language of Ungazigmit (a dialect of the Siberian Yupik language) has been adopted, they speak it with some variation, making a dialect.
 Younger generations do not speak any Eskimo language (neither that of Ungazigmit), they speak Russian. But the cultural identity is maintained not only through linguistic factors, there is also a "sense of place" concerning their village. Sirenik is the only Eskimo settlement in Siberia that has not been relocated, thus it has preserved its 2500-year-long anciency.

The cultural identity of other ethnic groups living in Sirenik settlement has been researched as well.

Spiritual culture 
At one time, traditional spiritual practices were prohibited by authorities, still, some knowledge about these ways survived. The last shaman in Sireniki died around 1990. Since then there has been no shaman in the village. Scholars observed shamanic practices among the Sireniki in the early 20th century. A folklore tale text mentions a feast that could possibly include shamanic features.

Folklore

Animals 

In their folklore, we can find the motif of the benevolent spider:
 In many tales, the spider saves the protagonist from peril with its cobweb, capable of lifting the endangered hero up to the sky. The same motif is present also in Siberian Yupik folklore.
 The spider is a benevolent creature also in another Sirenik Eskimo tale, where she (personified as an old woman) desires the gift of eternal life for people: old age followed by rejuvenation. In this question, the spider is standing in debate with the beetle: the latter proposes, that human life should end in death.

Also some other animals can be presented in folklore as helpers of people: loon, fox, wolf, mouse, deer. As for malevolent powers, devils belong to such dangers, they can feature in the shape of human, animal or fantastic beings. As mentioned, beetle can be presented as malevolent for people. Folklore can feature man fighting with a big worm.

Space and time 

Mythology of this culture can reveal some beliefs about time and space.

Temporal dilation motif 

There is a motif in some Paleoasiatic cultures: wandering people, after a long absence, observe that they have remained young compared to their children who remained at home. Sirenik Eskimos have such a tale as well: the protagonist, returning home after a long travel, must face with the fact that his son has become an old man (while he himself remained young).

More familiar examples of folklore from the world presenting such kind of temporal dilation motifs: Urashima Taro and (without remaining young) Rip Van Winkle.

Celestial motifs 

Another tale presents the sky as an upper world where people can get to and return from, and experience adventures there: communicate with people living there, kill a big worm, observe the earth from up there through a hole, descend back to the earth.

Magic 

Several Eskimo peoples had beliefs in usage of amulets, formulae (spells, charms). Furthermore, several peoples living in more or less isolated groups (including many Eskimo ones) understand natural phenomena on a personal level: there are imagined beings resembling to human but differing as well. As for Sirenik Eskimos, in one of their tales, we find the motif of the effective calling of natural phenomena for help in danger: an eagle is pursuing people on the ice, and a woman begins to talk about calling wind and frost, then at once the river freezes in, and the eagle freezes onto the ice.

Some tale examples 

Only their short summaries follow. Quotation marks refer not to literate citation, they just separate remarks from tale summaries.

Cormorants 

An animal tale, taking place on a cliff near the so-called fast-ice edge, narrating a conflict between a cormorant and a raven family. The raven wants to steal and eat a child of the a cormorant pair by deceit, but one of the cormorants notices the trick and turns it against the raven so that the robber eats its own child unknowing.

Yari 

The sample of a loon's cry is just an illustration. It is not linked to any ethnographic record, it is only of ethological relevance.

This tale shows Chukchi people influence, moreover, it may be a direct borrowing. It is an example of the "[domesticated] reindeer" genre, presenting conflicts among different groups for seizing reindeer herds. The tale features also magical animal helpers (the wolf and the diver).

Cousins 

A Chukchi tale contains almost the same series of motifs (except for the incest and the infanticide at the beginning). The Chukchi tale begins with the girl's finding a skull incidentally. Besides that, in the Chukchi tale, the girl, just after having been abandoned by her parents, begins to accuse the skull and push it with her feet rudely. And on the visit of her returning parents, she seemingly forgives them, but kills them by deceit.

A related tale has been collected also among Ungazighmiit (belonging to Siberian Yupik). Like the Sirenik variant, also the Ungazighmii one begins with the incest of cousins and the following infanticide, but it is the father of the girl who wants to kill his own daughter, and the father of the boy persuades him to kill the boy instead. At the end of the tale, the girl shows no sign of revenge, and it is the boy who initiates something that petrifies the parents (literally).

Man with two wives 

The author mentions the time dilation motif (mentioned above), present among several Paleoasian peoples. The text of the tale itself does not contain a direct mentioning of time dilation caused by travel or absence: the protagonist's remaining young seems to be rather the result of a bless, spoken by the old man the protagonist has saved.

Man 

The same or similar motifs can be found also among Ungazigmit, moreover, an Ungazigmi tale extends the story with the further life of the girl after having been pulled up to the sky by the benevolent spider.

Taboo 

Like several other Eskimo groups, the inhabitants of Sirenik had beliefs prohibiting certain activities, that were thought to be disadvantageous in a magical way. Carrying an uncovered drum on the street was thought to trigger stormy weather. Bad weather was the supposed effect of burning seaweed on campfire, too. A great deal of the taboos (like several other beliefs) were thought to serve chances of survival and sustenance, securing abundance of game. Several of them restricted the exploitation of resources (game).

Shamanism 

Like Eskimo cultures themselves, examples of shamanism among Eskimo peoples can be diverse.

During the Stalinist and post-Stalinist periods, shamanism was prohibited by authorities. Nevertheless, some knowledge about shamanistic practices survived. The last shaman in Sirenik died before 2000, and since then there has been no shaman in the village. Earlier in the 20th century, shamanistic practices could be observed by scholars in Sirenik, and also a folklore text mentions a feast that could include shamanistic features.

Recent history and today 
The Sirenik Eskimo maintain traditional subsistence skills, such as building large skin boats similar to the angyapik among Siberian Yupik, and umiak among many other Eskimo peoples.

Poverty, unemployment, and alcoholism challenge their community. Medical care and supplies to the settlement can be inadequate.

References

Latin 

 
 
 
 
 
 
 
 
 
 
 
 
  Note that term "Inuit" is used here in an extended sense.

Cyrillic 

  The transliteration of author's name, and the rendering of title in English: 
  The transliteration of author's name, and the rendering of title in English: 
  The transliteration of author's name, and the rendering of title in English:

External links 

  Rendering in English: Sireniki settlement, Kunstkamera, Russian Academy of Sciences.
  Enlarged versions of the above series, select with the navigation arrows or the form.
  Rendering in English: Imtuk settlement, Kunstkamera, Russian Academy of Sciences.
  Enlarged versions of the above series, select with the navigation arrows or the form.
  Rendering in English: Eskimos and maritime Chukchi about Greenland whale, Biodiversity Conservation Center.
  Note that term "Inuit" is used here in an extended sense.
 
 
 
 . Aron Nutawyi is an experienced local elder who initiated the project, assisted by Natalya Rodionova (Наталья Родионова). As the context of the linked annotation suggests, it is not in the old, now extinct Sireniki Eskimo language that the work concerns, but it is the Siberian Yupik variant that followed it after the language shift (also it being endangered).

.
Eskimos
Indigenous peoples in the Arctic
Ethnic groups in Siberia
Indigenous peoples of North Asia
Indigenous small-numbered peoples of the North, Siberia and the Far East
People from Chukotka Autonomous Okrug
Chukchi Sea